Briton Ferry railway station is a minor station in the village of Briton Ferry, south Wales. The station is located at ground level at Shelone Road in Briton Ferry. It is a stop on the South Wales Main Line, served by Transport for Wales Swanline regional trains between Swansea and Cardiff.

The station is sited within the Cwrt Sart junction complex where the Swansea District Line meets the South Wales Main Line. The present station opened on 1 June 1994, which replaced an earlier station that closed to passengers on 2 November 1964 and to goods services on 6 September 1965.

Facilities

The station has 2 platforms:
Platform 1, for westbound trains towards Swansea
Platform 2, for eastbound trains towards Cardiff Central

The station is unmanned - there is no ticket office nor are there any platform entry barriers.  Passengers must purchase tickets on board trains.

Services
The typical service pattern is one train approximately every two hours in each direction. Some westbound trains continue on to Carmarthen and Milford Haven. There is no Sunday service. A normal weekday service operates on most Bank Holidays.

References

Sources

External links

Railway stations in Neath Port Talbot
DfT Category F1 stations
Former Great Western Railway stations
Railway stations in Great Britain opened in 1935
Railway stations in Great Britain closed in 1964
Railway stations opened by Railtrack
Railway stations in Great Britain opened in 1994
Reopened railway stations in Great Britain
Railway stations served by Transport for Wales Rail
Beeching closures in Wales
South Wales Main Line
railway